The 1995 Hopman Cup was the seventh edition of the Hopman Cup that was held at the Burswood Entertainment Complex, in Perth, Western Australia.

Teams

Seeds 
  – Jana Novotná and Petr Korda (semifinals)
 ' – Anke Huber and Boris Becker (champions)'  - Conchita Martínez and Albert Costa (quarterfinals)  – Lindsay Davenport and Richey Reneberg (quarterfinals)  - Natalia Medvedeva and Andrei Medvedev (final)  - Julie Halard and Jean-Philippe Fleurian (semifinals)  - Amanda Coetzer and Christo van Rensburg (first round)  - Judith Wiesner and Horst Skoff (quarterfinals) Unseeded 
  – Inés Gorrochategui and Javier Frana (first round)  – Kristine Radford and Pat Cash (quarterfinals)  – Brenda Schultz and Tom Nijssen (first round)  – Åsa Carlsson and Mats Wilander (first round)''

Draw

First round

South Africa vs. Australia

Ukraine vs. Sweden

Netherlands vs. France

Argentina vs. Austria

Quarterfinals

Czech Republic vs. Australia

United States vs. Ukraine

France vs. Spain

Austria vs. Germany

Semifinals

Czech Republic vs. Ukraine

France vs. Germany

Final

Germany vs. Ukraine

External links
 1995 Hopman Cup Draw and Results itftennis.com

Hopman Cups by year
Hopman Cup